ATP synthase subunit g, mitochondrial is an enzyme that in humans is encoded by the ATP5MG gene.

Mitochondrial ATP synthase catalyzes ATP synthesis, utilizing an electrochemical gradient of protons across the inner membrane during oxidative phosphorylation. It is composed of two linked multi-subunit complexes: the soluble catalytic core, F1, and the membrane-spanning component, Fo, which comprises the proton channel. The F1 complex consists of 5 different subunits (alpha, beta, gamma, delta, and epsilon) assembled in a ratio of 3 alpha, 3 beta, and a single representative of the other 3. The Fo seems to have nine subunits (a, b, c, d, e, f, g, F6 and 8). This gene encodes the g subunit of the F0 complex.

The function of subunit G is currently unknown. There is no counterpart in chloroplast or bacterial F-ATPases identified so far.

References

External links

Further reading